"Fine by Me" is a song by American recording artist Chris Brown from his seventh studio album Royalty. It was released as a single on November 27, 2015, by RCA Records.

Background 
On October 7, 2015, he posted on his Instagram account a video where he was lip-synching a snipped of "Fine by Me". The song was released, along with the pre-order on iTunes on November 26, 2015. On the following day, it was officially released as the album's fourth single.

Music video 
On November 27, 2015, Brown uploaded the music video for "Fine by Me" on his YouTube and Vevo account.

Synopsis 
The video begins at the end of his video "Zero", and starts with Brown stumbling out of a convenience store before a girl lures him into a mysterious warehouse. He is told to change clothes and is greeted by a man on the screen who is out for blood. The madman unleashes his henchmen, who fight Brown on the dance floor doing an orchestrated fight-dance scene, but at the end he's able to defeat them all with his fighting moves.

Charts

References

2015 singles
2015 songs
Chris Brown songs
RCA Records singles
Songs written by Chris Brown
Songs written by Sean Douglas (songwriter)
Songs written by Ian Kirkpatrick (record producer)
Song recordings produced by the Monsters & Strangerz
Songs written by Talay Riley
Songs written by Stefan Johnson
Songs written by Jordan Johnson (songwriter)
Songs written by Eskeerdo
Song recordings produced by Ian Kirkpatrick (record producer)
Synthwave songs